Cystiscus mancelli is a species of sea snail, a marine gastropod mollusk in the family Cystiscidae.

Description

Distribution
This marine species occurs in the Mascarene Basin.

References

 Drivas, J. & M. Jay (1988). Coquillages de La Réunion et de l'île Maurice
 Cossignani T. (2006). Marginellidae & Cystiscidae of the World. L'Informatore Piceno. 408pp
 Bozzetti L. (2013) Note on the genus Closia Gray, 1857 (Marginellidae, Marginellinae). Malacologia Mostra Mondiale 78: 13–17

Cystiscidae
Gastropods described in 1875
Manceli